Yuya Yajima (born 14 July 1996) is a Japanese swimmer. He competed in the men's 200 metre butterfly event at the 2018 FINA World Swimming Championships (25 m), in Hangzhou, China.

References

External links
 

1996 births
Living people
Japanese male butterfly swimmers
Place of birth missing (living people)
Universiade medalists in swimming
Medalists at the 2015 Summer Universiade
Universiade silver medalists for Japan
21st-century Japanese people